Lorna Doone: A Romance of Exmoor is a novel by English author Richard Doddridge Blackmore, published in 1869. It is a romance based on a group of historical characters and set in the late 17th century in Devon and Somerset, particularly around the East Lyn Valley area of Exmoor. In 2003, the novel was listed on the BBC's survey The Big Read.

Publication history
Blackmore experienced difficulty in finding a publisher, and the novel was first published anonymously in 1869, in a limited three-volume edition of just 500 copies, of which only 300 sold. The following year it was republished in an inexpensive one-volume edition and became a huge critical and financial success. It has never been out of print.

Reception
It received acclaim from Blackmore's contemporary, Margaret Oliphant, and as well from later Victorian writers including Robert Louis Stevenson, Gerard Manley Hopkins, and Thomas Hardy. George Gissing wrote in a letter to his brother Algernon that the novel was "quite admirable, approaching Scott as closely as anything since the latter". A favourite among females, it was also popular among male readers, and was chosen by male students at Yale in 1906 as their favourite novel.

Development of the novel
By his own account, Blackmore relied on a "phonologic" style for his characters' speech, emphasising their accents and word formation. He expended great effort, in all of his novels, on his characters' dialogues and dialects, striving to recount realistically not only the ways, but also the tones and accents, in which thoughts and utterances were formed by the various sorts of people who lived on Exmoor in the 17th century.

Blackmore incorporated real events and places into the novel. The Great Winter described in chapters 41–45 was a real event.
He himself attended Blundell's School in Tiverton which serves as the setting for the opening chapters. One of the inspirations behind the plot is said to be the shooting of Mary Whiddon on her wedding day at the parish church of Chagford, Devon, in the 17th century. Unlike the heroine of the novel, she did not survive, but is commemorated in the church. Apparently, Blackmore invented the name "Lorna", possibly drawing on a Scottish source.

According to the preface, the work is a romance and not a historical novel, because the author neither "dares, nor desires, to claim for it the dignity or cumber it with the difficulty of an historical novel." As such, it combines elements of traditional romance, of Sir Walter Scott's historical novel tradition, of the pastoral tradition, of traditional Victorian values, and of the contemporary sensation novel trend. Along with the historical aspects are folk traditions, such as the many legends based around both the Doones and Tom Faggus. The composer Puccini once considered using the story as the plot for an opera, but abandoned the idea.

Plot summary

John Ridd is the son of a respectable farmer in 17th century Exmoor, a region in North Devon and Somerset, England. The notorious Doone clan, once nobles and now outlaws, murdered John’s father. Battling his desire for revenge, John (in West Country dialect, pronounced "Jan") too grows into a respectable farmer who cares well for his mother and sisters. He meets Lorna by accident and falls hopelessly in love. She turns out (apparently) to be the granddaughter of Sir Ensor, lord of the Doones. Sir Ensor’s impetuous and now jealous heir Carver will let nothing thwart his plan to marry Lorna once he comes into his inheritance.

Sir Ensor dies, and Carver becomes lord of the Doones. John helps Lorna escape to his family's farm. Since Lorna is a Doone the Ridds have mixed feelings toward her but defend her against Carver's retaliatory attack. During a visit from the Counsellor, Carver's father and the wisest Doone, Lorna's necklace is stolen. Sir Ensor had told Lorna the necklace was her mother’s. A family friend soon discovers the necklace belonged to a Lady Dugal, who was robbed and murdered by outlaws. Only her daughter survived. Lorna is not a Doone after all, but heiress to a huge fortune. By law, but against her will, she must return to London as a ward in Chancery. Despite John and Lorna's love, their marriage is out of the question.

King Charles II dies, and the Duke of Monmouth, the late king's illegitimate son, challenges Charles's brother James for the throne. Hoping to reclaim their ancestral lands, the Doones abandon their plan to marry Lorna to Carver and claim her wealth, and side with Monmouth. Monmouth is defeated at the Battle of Sedgemoor, and his associates are sought for treason. Although innocent, John Ridd is captured during the rebellion. An old friend takes John to London to clear John’s name. Reunited with Lorna, John thwarts an attack on her guardian, Earl Brandir. The king then pardons John and grants him a title.

The communities around Exmoor have tired of the Doones’ depredations. Knowing the Doones better than any other man, John leads the attack. All the Doone men are killed except the Counsellor and Carver, who escapes vowing revenge. When Earl Brandir dies, Lorna’s new guardian allows her to return to Exmoor and marry John. Carver bursts into their wedding, shoots Lorna and flees. In a blind rage, John pursues Carver. A struggle leaves Carver sinking in a mire and John so exhausted that he can only watch as Carver dies. John discovers that Lorna has survived, and after a period of anxious uncertainty they live happily ever after.

Chronological key
The narrator, John Ridd, says he was born on 29 November 1661; in Chapter 24, he mentions Queen Anne as the current monarch, so the time of narration is 1702–1714 making him 40–52 years old. Although he celebrates New Year's Day on 1 January, at that time in England the year in terms of A.D. "begins" Annunciation Style on 25 March, so 14 February 1676 would still be 1675 according to the old reckoning. Most of the dates below are given explicitly in the book.

List of chapters, with dates where mentioned:

 Elements of Education
 An Important Item (29 Nov 73, 12th birthday)
 The War-path of the Doones
 A Rash Visit
 An Illegal Settlement
 Necessary Practice (Dec 73)
 Hard It Is to Climb (29 Nov 75, 14 Feb 76)
 A Boy and a Girl
 There Is No Place Like Home
 A Brave Rescue and a Rough Ride (Nov 76)
 Tom Deserves His Supper (Nov 76)
 A Man Justly Popular (Nov 76, Feb 77, Dec 82)
 Master Huckaback Comes In (31 Dec 82)
 A Motion Which Ends in a Mull (1 Jan 83)
 Quo Warranto? (Jan 83)
 Lorna Growing Formidable (14 Feb 83)
 John Is Bewitched
 Witchery Leads to Witchcraft (Mar)
 Another Dangerous Interview
 Lorna Begins Her Story
 Lorna Ends Her Story
 A Long Spring Month (Mar, Apr)
 A Royal Invitation
 A Safe Pass for King's Messenger
 A Great Man Attends to Business
 John Is Drained and Cast Aside
 Home Again at Last (Aug 83?)
 John Has Hope of Lorna
 Reaping Leads to Revelling
 Annie Gets the Best of It
 John Fry's Errand
 The Feeding of the Pigs
 An Early Morning Call (Oct 83)
 Two Negatives Make an Affirmative
 Ruth Is Not Like Lorna
 John Returns to Business (Nov)
 A Very Desperate Venture
 A Good Turn for Jeremy
 A Troubled State and a Foolish Joke
 Two Fools Together
 Cold Comfort
 The Great Winter (Dec 83)
 Not Too Soon
 Brought Home at Last
 Change Long Needed (15 Dec 83 – 7 Mar 84)
 Squire Faggus Makes Some Lucky Hits
 Jeremy in Danger
 Every Man Must Defend Himself
 Maiden Sentinels Are Best
 A Merry Meeting a Sad One
 A Visit from the Counsellor
 The Way To Make the Cream Rise
 Jeremy Finds Out Something
 Mutual Discomfiture
 Getting into Chancery
 John Becomes Too Popular
 Lorna Knows Her Nurse
 Master Huckaback's Secret
 Lorna Gone Away
 Annie Luckier Than John (autumn 84)
 Therefore He Seeks Comfort (autumn-winter 84)
 The King Must Not Be Prayed For (8 Feb 13 Jun, Jul 85)
 John Is Worsted by the Women (Jul 85)
 Slaughter in the Marshes (Sedgemoor, 6 Jul 85)
 Falling Among Lambs
 Suitable Devotion
 Lorna Still Is Lorna
 John Is John No Longer
 Not To Be Put Up With
 Compelled to Volunteer
 A Long Account Settled
 The Counsellor and the Carver
 How To Get Out of Chancery
 Blood Upon the Altar [in some editions, At the Altar] (Whittuesday 86)
 Give Away the Grandeur [in some editions, Given Back]

Other versions and cultural references

Lorna Doone is also a shortbread cookie made by Mondelez.
Title character Lorna Doone, a B-movie actress in a Thomas Tryon novella was christened in honor of Blackmore's character.
Lorna Doone was said to be the favourite book of Australian bushranger and outlaw Ned Kelly, who may have thought of the idea of his armour by reading of the outlaw Doones "with iron plates on breast and head."
The phrase "Lorna Doone" is used in Cockney rhyming slang for spoon.
Lorna Doone is a character portrayed by Christine McIntyre in The Three Stooges shorts The Hot Scots and Scotched in Scotland.
The book inspired the song "Pangs of Lorna" by Kraus.
There is reference to R.D. Blackmore's Lorna Doone in John Galsworthy's play Justice (1910).
Atholl Oakeley, British wrestling promoter, was fascinated by the book, and billed Exmoor-born wrestler Jack Baltus as Carver Doone in the 1930s.
 Cartoonist H. M. Brock produced a comic book adaptation of Lorna Doone for the British girls' comic Princess (1960).
"Lornadoon" (or "Lalornadoon") is the name for the forest of Lothlórien in the Lord of the Rings parody Bored of the Rings.
Lornado is the 1908 official 32-room residence of the United States Ambassador to Canada in Ottawa, Canada, that was built by Warren Y. Soper, an Ottawa industrialist, who named it in homage to one of his favorite novels, Lorna Doone.
 In Lethal Weapon 3 when Roger Murtaugh and Martin Riggs are being introduced to Head of Intelligence Herman Walters and Internal Affairs Sgt Lorna Cole, Riggs derisively calls her "Lorna Doone", Murtaugh then says "Lorna COLE", apparently not recognizing the reference.

References

Further reading
Blackmore, R. D. (1908) Lorna Doone: a romance of Exmoor; Doone-land edition; with introduction and notes by H. Snowden Ward and illustrations by Mrs. Catharine Weed Ward. lii, 553 pp., plates. London: Sampson Low, Marston and Company (includes "Slain by the Doones", pp. 529–53)
Delderfield, Eric (1965?) The Exmoor Country: [a] brief guide & gazetteer; 6th ed. Exmouth: The Raleigh Press
Elliott-Cannon, A. (1969) The Lorna Doone Story''. Minehead: The Cider Press

External links

 – a lavishly illustrated edition (Burrows Brothers Company, 1889)
HTML online text of Lorna Doone
Lorna Doone at Silver Sirens
 

1869 British novels
Novels by R. D. Blackmore
Exmoor
Novels adapted into comics
British novels adapted into films
British novels adapted into television shows
Novels set in the 1680s
Novels set in Devon
Novels set in Somerset
Novels set in Early Modern England
Literary characters introduced in 1869